Tommy Sims (born September 29, 1964) is a former American football defensive back. He played for the Indianapolis Colts in 1986.

References

1964 births
Living people
American football defensive backs
Tennessee Volunteers football players
Indianapolis Colts players
People from Americus, Georgia